Søndfjords Avis was a Norwegian newspaper published in Florø in Sogn og Fjordane between 1898 and 1909. It was a publication of the liberal Venstre political party and took a radical stance on political matters, such as advocating republicanism. For this, it took a significant drop in readership from 1905 following the Norwegian monarchy plebiscite. A digital archive of the newspaper is available at the University of Bergen.

Editors
Elias Pedersen 1898-1903 
Martin Vanberg 1903-1905
Ole Johan Vasbotten 1905-1909
Olaf Rank Seter 1909

References

1898 establishments in Norway
1909 disestablishments in Norway
Defunct newspapers published in Norway
Norwegian-language newspapers
Publications established in 1898
Publications disestablished in 1909
Republicanism in Norway